Enumclaw Courier-Herald is a newspaper in Enumclaw, Washington, established in 1933 as a merge of Enumclaw Courier (since 1900) and Enumclaw Herald (since 1908).

Background
Kevin Hanson was the editor from 2001 to early 2012, at which time Dennis Box was named editor.

Bill Marcum was the publisher in 2003. In August 2010, the paper announced that Marcum would be leaving the Courier-Herald in September to become regional manager of Nickel Ads in Portland, Oregon. Brennan Purtzer became the new publisher of the Courier-Herald the following October, and left in March 2012.

The newspaper was purchased by Black Press subsidiary Sound Publishing on 3 June 2008.

References

External links 
 
 Enumclaw Courier-Herald at Chronicling America
 The Enumclaw Courier
 Enumclaw Herald
  at WorldCat

Publications established in 1933
Newspapers published in Washington (state)
Black Press newspapers
Enumclaw, Washington
1933 establishments in Washington (state)